The UC Merced Golden Bobcats are the intercollegiate athletics teams that represent the University of California, Merced (UCM), located in Merced, California, in intercollegiate sports as a member of the National Association of Intercollegiate Athletics (NAIA), primarily competing in the California Pacific Conference (Cal Pac) since the 2011–12 academic year.

The University plans to join and compete at the NCAA Division II level as part of the California Collegiate Athletic Association (CCAA).

History
On April 19, 2011, the NAIA made UC Merced one of four new members to join the organization. On May 6, 2011, the Golden Bobcats were made official members of the CalPac. The school colors are royal blue and gold.

Club/intramural sports
The UC Merced Recreation and Athletics Department sponsors Club sports, including: archery, the Bobcat Dance Team, cheer, tennis, golf, and softball as of now. The university plans on adding more ICA and Club teams as the school progresses.

Intramural sports include a wide array of sports such as basketball, ultimate frisbee, flag football, dodgeball, grass volleyball, indoor volleyball, table tennis, soccer, e-sports, archery, etc.

Varsity teams
All of UC Merced's intercollegiate sports teams compete in the California Pacific Conference. The UC Merced Recreation and Athletics Department sponsors twelve intercollegiate varsity sports. Men's sports include basketball, cross country, soccer, volleyball, waterpolo and outdoor track and field; while women's sports include basketball, cross country, soccer, volleyball, waterpolo and outdoor track and field.

References

External links
 

 
UC Merced Golden Bobcats
University of California, Merced